Diza in Iran may refer to:
 Diza, East Azerbaijan
 Diza, Isfahan